Daniel E. Bosley (born December 9, 1953 in North Adams, Massachusetts ) is a former member of the Massachusetts House of Representatives and as president of the North Adams SteepleCats of the New England Collegiate Baseball League from 2011-2018. Bosley is the President of Dan Bosley Consulting Services, a government consulting agency.

Education
Bosley was educated at Drury High School; graduated with his B.A. (cum laude) in 1976 from North Adams State College and earned his M.S. in Public Affairs in 1996 from the University of Massachusetts Boston.

Political career
Bosley served on the North Adams City Council from 1983-1984. From 1987–2011 he represented the First Berkshire district in the Massachusetts House of Representatives. Bosley was a candidate for Sheriff of Berkshire County, but lost in the Democratic primary to Thomas Bowler.

On April 11, 2014, Bosley endorsed Don Berwick for Governor of Massachusetts.

Committee assignments
House Committee on Bonding, Capital Expenditures and State Assets (Vice-Chairman), February 2009 – present
Joint Committee on Economic Development and Emerging Technologies (House Chairman), January 2005 – February 2009.
Joint Committee on Government Regulations (House Chairman), May 1996 – January 2005
Joint Committee on Labor and Workforce Development (House Chairman), January 1992 – May 1996
Joint Committee on Public Service (House Vice-Chairman), 1990–1991

References

External links

Massachusetts House of Representatives: Official biography
iberkshires.com: "Bosley To Stay In The House"

1953 births
Living people
Massachusetts College of Liberal Arts alumni
Massachusetts city council members
Democratic Party members of the Massachusetts House of Representatives
People from North Adams, Massachusetts
University of Massachusetts Boston alumni
Baseball executives
Baseball people from Massachusetts
Sportspeople from Berkshire County, Massachusetts